Jabbi Kasran is a  village and union council in Attock District of Punjab Province in Pakistan. It is close to Kala Chitta Range and Nandna stream flows across it.

Jabbi Kasran Union Council in Attock District has different villages, including Pind Niazi, Kot Salabat, Batthu, Dordad, Moqam.

References 

Villages in Attock District
Union councils of Attock District